The Song of Buenos Aires is a 1945 Argentine musical film directed by Julio Irigoyen. It is a tango film, a genre that was popular during the Golden Age of Argentine Cinema.

References

Bibliography
 Plazaola, Luis Trelles. South American Cinema. La Editorial UPR, 1989.

External links
 

1945 films
1945 musical films
Argentine musical films
1940s Spanish-language films
Argentine black-and-white films
Films set in Buenos Aires
Films shot in Buenos Aires
Tango films
Films directed by Julio Irigoyen
1940s Argentine films